Pinckney is a village in Putnam Township, Livingston County in the U.S. state of Michigan. The population was 2,427 at the 2010 census.

Among the first American pioneers in the area around Pinckney were William Kirkland and his family, who moved from New York in the late 1820s. Kirkland named the community after his brother, Charles Pinckney Kirkland. Platted in 1837, Pinckney was incorporated as a village in 1883.

Geography

Demographics

2010 census
As of the census of 2010, there were 2,427 people, 869 households, and 648 families living in the village. The racial makeup of the village was 97.9% White, 0.1% African American, 0.2% Native American, 0.3% Asian, 0.3% from other races, and 1.2% from two or more races. Hispanic or Latino of any race were 1.8% of the population.

There were 869 households, of which 45.5% had children under the age of 18 living with them, 56.4% were married couples living together, 13.6% had a female householder with no husband present, 4.6% had a male householder with no wife present, and 25.4% were non-families. 21.5% of all households were made up of individuals, and 6.5% had someone living alone who was 65 years of age or older. The average household size was 2.78 and the average family size was 3.25.

The median age in the village was 34.1 years. 31.2% of residents were under the age of 18; 6.5% were between the ages of 18 and 24; 31.3% were from 25 to 44; 23.6% were from 45 to 64; and 7.4% were 65 years of age or older. The gender makeup of the village was 49.0% male and 51.0% female.

2000 census
As of the census of 2000, there were 2,141 people, 731 households, and 573 families living in the village. The racial makeup of the village was 97.80% White, 0.14% African American.

There were 731 households, out of which 48.7% had children under the age of 18 living with them, 62.7% were married couples living together, 11.9% had a female householder with no husband present, and 21.6% were non-families. 16.7% of all households were made up of individuals, and 6.4% had someone living alone who was 65 years of age or older.  The average household size was 2.90 and the average family size was 3.28.

In the village, the population was spread out, with 32.7% under the age of 18, 7.7% from 18 to 24, 36.0% from 25 to 44, 17.7% from 45 to 64, and 6.0% who were 65 years of age or older.  The median age was 31 years. For every 100 females, there were 102.6 males.  For every 100 females age 18 and over, there were 99.7 males.

The median income for a household in the village was $58,077, and the median income for a family was $60,776. Males had a median income of $45,125 versus $27,198 for females. The per capita income for the village was $20,429.  About 4.4% of families and 5.7% of the population were below the poverty line, including 4.8% of those under age 18 and 9.9% of those age 65 or over.

Education
Pinckney is home to Pinckney Community Schools, which consists of Pinckney High School, Pathfinder School, Navigator Upper Elementary, Country Elementary, & Farley Hill Elementary. Lakeland Elementary, Pinckney Elementary and Hamburg Elementary have been closed due to the decrease of residents in the area.  Also home to a Montessori Charter school called Light of the World Academy, and St. Marys Catholic School.

Cultural life and recreation

Pinckney hosts annual parades on Saint Patrick's Day and Memorial Day. Pinckney Community Schools student musicians join with the Ann Arbor Symphony Orchestra for an annual Side-by-Side concert at the high school. Nearby the village (to the west) is the Pinckney State Recreation Area, and also the popular tourist destination of Hell, Michigan.  Lakelands Trail State Park passes through Pinckney.

Notable people
 Ron Jeffries, Computer Scientist, co-inventor of Extreme Programming, and co-creator of the Agile Manifesto
 Caroline Kirkland, 19th century writer and wife of village founder William Kirkland
 Denny McLain, former pitcher for the Detroit Tigers
 Chris Sabin, professional wrestler
 Robert Sabuda, children's pop-up book artist and paper engineer
 Zach Sieler, defensive end for the Miami Dolphins
 Glendon Swarthout, novelist and short story writer
 Jake Vedder, Snowboarder for 2022 Winter Olympics Snowboard Cross team

References

External links
Pinckney website
Pinckney Community Schools web page

Villages in Livingston County, Michigan
Villages in Michigan